Kapwepwe is a surname. It may refer to:

Chileshe Kapwepwe, Zambian accountant and corporate executive
Mulenga Kapwepwe or Mpundu Kapwepwe (born 1958), Zambian author, co-founder of the Zambian Women's History Museum. Daughter to Simon Kapwepwe
Simon Kapwepwe (1922–1980), Zambian politician, Vice President of Zambia from 1967 to 1970

See also
Simon Mwansa Kapwepwe International Airport, Ndola, northern Zambia